Ormarr Örlygsson (born 24 November 1962) is an Icelandic former footballer who played as a defender.

Club career
Ormarr played the majority of his career at hometown club KA Akureyri and had a four-year spell at Fram Reykjavík.

International career
He made his debut for Iceland in a March 1983 friendly match against Bahrain and went on to win 9 caps, scoring no goals. His final international was an April 1992 friendly match against Israel.

Personal life
He is the older brother of former international player and Nottingham Forest winger Þorvaldur Örlygsson. He was appointed branch manager of Íslandsbanki in Reyðarfjörður and Egilsstaðir in 2010 after working fot a couple of years in Switzerland for a German chemical company.

References

External links
 
 

1962 births
Living people
Association football defenders
Ormarr Orlygsson
Ormarr Orlygsson
Knattspyrnufélag Akureyrar players
Knattspyrnufélagið Fram players
Þór Akureyri players